Parahyparrhenia is a genus of Afro-Asian plants in the grass family.

 Species
 Parahyparrhenia annua (Hack.) Clayton 	- Sahara + Sahel regions of Africa
 Parahyparrhenia bellariensis (Hack.) Clayton - Andhra Pradesh
 Parahyparrhenia khannae A. P. Tiwari & Chorghe - Gujarat & Madhya Pradesh, India
 Parahyparrhenia laegaardii Veldkamp - Thailand
 Parahyparrhenia perennis Clayton - Burkina Faso, Guinea, Liberia, Senegal
 Parahyparrhenia siamensis Clayton - Thailand, Laos
 Parahyparrhenia tridentata Clayton - Thailand

References

Andropogoneae
Poaceae genera
Taxa named by Aimée Antoinette Camus